Neverwinter is a free-to-play massively multiplayer online role-playing game developed by Cryptic Studios for Microsoft Windows in 2013, Xbox One in 2015, and PlayStation 4 in 2016. Based on the fictional Forgotten Realms city of Neverwinter from Dungeons & Dragons, Neverwinter is a standalone game and not part of the previous Neverwinter Nights series.

Gameplay

Players can choose one of eight Dungeons & Dragons character classes and form groups of up to five player characters (PCs). Neverwinter was originally based on a modified version of the Dungeons & Dragons 4th edition rules set.  This includes the use of healing powers and action points, the latter of which is implemented through a system referred to as dailies, allowing a player to perform a special ability by accumulating enough action points through combat. A player-created content system codenamed "Foundry" allows players to create their own stories and quests.

On October 5, 2011, it was announced that the gameplay of Neverwinter would be re-structured into a free-to-play MMORPG with extra items and other advantages available for purchase for a fee.

In August 2014, the Tyranny of Dragons module was used to bridge the narrative gap between the game and the then recently released 5th Edition Dungeons & Dragons. Many of the subsequent modules would have ties to 5th Edition Dungeons & Dragons storylines, such as Elemental Evil, Storm King's Thunder, Tomb of Annihilation, Ravenloft and Undermountain. In April 2019, all eight classes received varying levels of balance and adjustments and each class was renamed to align with 5th Edition Dungeons & Dragons.

Plot

Characters and setting
The setting of Neverwinter takes place in a time when the eponymous city is plunged into chaos after the disappearance of the last Lord of Neverwinter. In the aftermath of the Spellplague and a Primordial Fire Elemental's almost destroying Neverwinter, as seen in the novel Gauntlgrym, the remaining citizens form factions and struggle for dominance over the populace as the dead begin to rise and attack "the city they once called home." The player is investigating the Sect Crown of Neverwinter and trying to figure out what the skeletons and another mysterious group are looking for. The included locations are based on the novels Gauntlgrym, Neverwinter, and Charon's Claw. Players are also able to create whole new locations that may or may not conform to the lore on which the rest of the game is based. This content is clearly distinguished so as not to confuse users, and they are informed whether they are playing user-generated or official content.

Story
Briefly assuming her pre-lich appearance, the Lich Queen Valindra attacks the soldiers of New Neverwinter, as new grounds are being built outside of the original city, which is being repaired. Valindra's actions spark the Battle of the Bridge, in which Barrabus the Gray (formerly known as Artemis Entreri) and Drizzt Do'Urden are rumored to be present by gossipers at a pub in the shattered town of Luskan. Each soldier tells his own story of the battle until one soldier reveals that Valindra's attack was going badly until the blue dragon, Fulminorax, a leader in the country of Thay, helped her escape. The soldier finishes by asking the people where they will be and what they will be doing when the dragon attacks again.

After their ship is sunk by a dracolich, adventurers help a nearby militia of Neverwinter against Valindra. While not confronting her directly on the Sleeping Dragon Bridge, the heroes fight a Harbinger, a huge humanoid undead, then go to Protector's Enclave to tell a Sergeant about what happened. For their valor, the adventurers become the Heroes of the Sleeping Bridge. Learning that the Nashers took advantage of Valindra's attack, the heroes track them to the Blacklake District. There they fight a chosen of Ghaunadaur and Nasher leader Karzov. With the Nasher Rebellion ended, the Heroes head to the Cloak Tower and defeat Vansi Bloodscar, an orcish commander from the Kingdom of Many-Arrows.

Sent to help Dorothea Linkletter, the spellscarred wife of Josef Linkletter, the Heroes learn the wizard Rhazzad has sacrificed all the spellscarred victims he hid from Helm's Hold. Learning Rhazzad's masters to be in the Chasm, the heroes defeat the wizard when he turns into a plague-changed monstrosity. Forced to delay going after Rhazzad's masters, the Heroes are put in contact with the Harpers to fight against Malus and Traven Blackdagger. Learning the Blackdagger brothers to have been turned undead by the Thayan necromancer Kallos Tam, the Heroes defeat the pirates and Valindra's agent. Learning the Red Wizard of Thay Xivros plans to raise Arleos the Unforgiven, the Heroes are unable to stop the resurrection but do put down the monster when it rises. The heroes also learn that in another part of Neverdeath Graveyard, Valindra defeated the Cult of the Dragon over the dracolich Azharzel. The Spellplague victims then become a priority again as the Prophet of Helm's Hold has been revealed to be a succubus called Rohini. With the Ashmadai active in Neverwinter, the Heroes raid the fortress, defeat Rohini and slay her green dragon Chartilifax.

When the Barrow Lords and the Netherese necromancer Idris raised the dead of Ebon Downs, the Heroes of the Sleeping Bridge were dispatched and defeated the undead. When the Uthgardt barbarians under the Netherese began to hunt down the Forsworn, the Heroes decided to put an end to the Netherese menace. Stopping Netheril's plans with Xin'Kar, a piece of the Enclave Xinlenal, the Heroes defeated the Uthgardt chieftain and Netherese forces. Joining forces with Company Yargo, the Heroes then took down another Blackdagger Pirate, the undead Bartholomew Blackdagger. Aiding the Icehammer Dwarves, the Heroes proceeded to slay the Frost Giant Hrimnir and destroy the Winterforge. When the Chasm is threatened by the Order of the Blue Fire, the Heroes finally begin to finish off another loose end: Rhazzad's masters. Heading down the Chasm, the Heroes find A'Drx'l, the Aboleth that was guiding Rhazzad, and slay it.

When Drow slavers from House Xorlarrin began appearing and creating a settlement called New Xorlarrin, the Heroes set out to stop them and put an end to their fledgling designs. In doing so, they learned that the Drow Goddess Lolth was trying to take over magic. While the Xorlarrins retreat, the Heroes defeat the Fire Giant Gommoth and red dragon Karrundax. The Xorlarrins retake the abandoned city of Zesraena and fight the Heroes at the Doors of Delzoun in a losing effort. Learning of the Xorlarrin alliance with Illithids, the Heroes fight the Mind Flayers and their Duergar thralls, eventually entering a structure known as the Iron Heart to defeat Yshiggol.

With their strength grown, the Heroes of the Sleeping Bridge decide to end the destructive conflict between Neverwinter and Thay by targeting Valindra Shadowmantle directly. Entering Castle Never, the Heroes fight through hordes of undead and Valindra's most powerful soldiers. Eventually confronting the Lich Queen directly, they defeat her and her dracolich Ahzarzel.

The Storm King/Icewind Dale
Ice begins to reach south, threatening to wipe out all life in the Dalelands and harm the City. Bryn Shandar comes under attack from hundreds of Frost Giants at the front of an apocalyptic blizzard, freezing the city and turning many of the inhabitants to ice. Artus Cimber arrives and claims that the weather and problems are being caused by the Ring of Winter, which was stolen from him, and that if the heroes can help him find it, he'll be able to reverse the events.

The heroes attempt to sneak into Fangbreaker Keep aboard a Frost Giant ship, but are discovered and are forced to flee. Makos stays behind to cover their escape, and is killed by a Frost Giant. Wulfgar and Cattie-brie recover his body and his is cremated upon return to Bryn Shandar, as Celeste tried and failed to resurrect him.

Cimbar tracks the Ring further north to Cold Run, and the Keep of the Frost Giant King. Upon a Trial, the group of heroes attack the Frost Giant king. Upon his defeat, he attempts to draw more power from the Ring, which backfires and turns him to ice.

The Jungles of Chult
Neverwinter comes under a death curse. The people of the Sword Coast are dying, although this does not affect any characters not a part of the plot. a mysterious character, later proven to be Makos, proposes that Chult may hold the answer. The player forms a party consisting of various characters in previous adventures including Minsc, Boo, Volo, and Celeste. Arriving in Chult, the group's ship is destroyed by dragon turtle after Volo refuses its demand for payment to enter its waters. Celeste, Cleric of Selûne, is killed by the Batiri, a kobold-like species that inhabit Chult. Finding her body, Makos has her returned to life by a Chultan witch doctor called Nani Pupu by sacrificing a Batiri. This does not resurrect Celeste, however, and she is returned as an undead version to her horror as undead are considered unnatural by her deity. This deviates slightly from established lore where Selûne had been the goddess of the moon and lycanthropy, but none of the source books through the fifth edition list Selûne as having a particular edict against undead.

The Cloaked Ascendancy
Following completion of the main storyline, Lord Neverember reopens the River District. In the middle of the ceremony, the Nashers, led by three powerful wizards, attack the procession and overrun the rebuilt section of the city, dividing it between themselves with the plan to eventually assault the city proper.

New Sharandar
Sharandar, destroyed by numerous attacks, is refounded in a new location. Despite efforts to hide, the Fomori launch an assault on the new elven homeland.

Barovia

Descent to Avernus
Zariel, Lady of the First Layer of the Nine Hells, captures large swathes of land and drags them into the Hells, intending to use the inhabitants as cannon fodder in the eternal Blood war. The Adventures enter Avernus through the estate of Vallenhas, whose family made a deal with the Demons in order to spare their family. Entering fragments of Zariels memories, they learn Zariel was overpowered in a failed attack on Hell, and was corrupted and turned into a Demon Lord.

Entering the Bleeding Citadel, they find Zariels divine sword. Using her sword to draw Zariel out of her flying fortress, Zariel is overpowered, and after her defeat, accepts an offer of redemption and resumes her angelic form, and takes command of the Citadel as a temporary beachhead to launch attacks into Avernus.

The Dragonbone Valley
Lich Queen Valindra, having restored herself after her defeat at Neverwinter, attempts to create a Mythal, an incredibly powerful form of ritual magic, that will turn every dragon in Faerun into a dracolich. The adventurer receives a plea from Elminster to come and support the Grand Alliance to stop the Thayans and Valindra. After collecting a handful of artifacts to reach the ritual site, Elminster and the dragon Galanthaxsis interrupt the ritual at the last moment, causing it to detonate and obliterate a chunk of the valley.

Development and release

Atari bought Cryptic Studios in the fall of 2009. In late August 2010, Atari announced Neverwinter, to be developed by Cryptic Studios, with a release scheduled for late 2011. They revealed that the game would coincide with a multi-media event revolving around the city of Neverwinter, including the release of four books (one already in stores), a co-operative board game and a Dungeons & Dragons role-playing game being released to promote the launch of the MMORPG. In May 2011, Atari announced that it would be selling Cryptic Studios, stating that development of Neverwinter would continue as normal, but only for the time being.

The game was first publicly displayed at E3 2011, where many details about the game were revealed. The game was originally scheduled to be released as a cross media event coinciding with the release of a series of four books by fantasy author R.A. Salvatore and a tabletop game from Wizards of the Coast. Laura Tommervik (Wizards of the Coast marketing team) explained the approach: "We use Neverwinter as the connective tissue across multiple product categories. The transmedia campaign is an opportunity for fans to experience the brand however they choose to".

Due to Cryptic's acquisition by Perfect World Entertainment, Neverwinter was delayed to 2012. Perfect World also bought the rights to publish the game from Atari, coinciding with the conclusion of Atari's lawsuit with Wizards of the Coast on the Dungeons & Dragons license. Perfect World announced that Neverwinter had shifted from the co-operative multiplayer game that was announced the previous year into a free-to-play MMORPG on October 5, 2011. This further delayed the game to late 2012. Perfect World would later again delay Neverwinter into early 2013 to better polish the game.

Prior to releasing major details on the game, Perfect World launched a viral marketing campaign called the Siege of Neverwinter, featuring videos from the game's story.  The game was at Penny Arcade Expo (Pax) East 2012, where it was awarded Best of Show by MMORPG.com. In the same month of showing at PAX East, it also appeared at Gamescom, where it showed off its Events feature, and Gen Con Indy, where it let attendees try out early version drow race characters. It was announced in 2012 that the game's campaign would feature sixty levels.  The game ran closed beta testing from February 8, 2013 to April 14, 2013. Open beta began on April 30, 2013.

Shannon Appelcline, author of the Designers & Dragons series, wrote the "Neverwinter Campaign Setting was launched as 4e's first major multimedia release — a marketing approach that Wizards would regularly use in later years. It was closely tied to a series of four novels, a comic book, two different computer games, and even a board game. [...] Two more Neverwinter computer games were appearing thanks to Wizards' 'transmedia' campaign. A new MMORPG simply called "Neverwinter" was to be the center of the Neverwinter rollout. Unfortunately it was delayed for two years due to the resolution of a computer gaming lawsuit and the subsequent sale of the developer, Cryptic Studios. [...] Neverwinter (2013) finally appear only after the rest of the launch. It continues to be supported to this day and has participated in some of D&D 5e's multimedia rollouts".

In June 2018, Cryptic Studios announced that over the course of five years:

 "The near 18 million players amount to 775 times the population of Neverwinter". 
 "Players have died 202 million times". 
 "The deadliest dungeon is the Temple of Lostmauth". 
 The most popular race is humans followed by Tieflings. 
 The most popular class is Great Weapon Fighter followed by Trickster Rogue and Hunter Ranger. 
 63 million monsters have been killed including more than 6.5 million dragons.
 

In December 2021, Swedish holding company Embracer Group announced that it would acquire the North American and publishing arms of Perfect World Entertainment from Perfect World Europe through its Gearbox Software subsidiary. Following the acquisition, Perfect World Entertainment was dissolved into Gearbox Publishing and renamed as Gearbox Publishing SF (San Francisco), who is now the current publisher for Neverwinter, while Cryptic will continue operations as a subsidiary of The Gearbox Entertainment Company.

Modules 
Neverwinter has released multiple updates to the game called modules. Modules were released first on the PC, and then later to consoles. With Northdark Reaches, the modules were released simultaneously on PC, Xbox, and Playstation.

Reception

Neverwinter has attained a score of 74/100 from aggregate review website Metacritic.

Microsoft Windows 
In 2013, Daniel Tack of Forbes wrote: "Neverwinter offers experiences for players that normally wouldn't play MMORPGs, and also provides a framework for core genre players. Looking for action and adventure in the world of Forgotten Realms? Neverwinter delivers." Stephanie Carmichael, for VentureBeat in 2013, wrote "It may have its flaws, but Neverwinter is highly enjoyable and accessible to veteran, beginner, and casual players alike".

Xbox One 
In 2015, the Polygon review reported that "Neverwinter on Xbox One manages to map your heroes' abilities effortlessly across the controller, in a scheme that feels great both in and out of combat. Unfortunately, other aspects of the port totally miss the mark; in terms of performance, Neverwinter on Xbox One can really take a dive".

In 2015, Boston Blake, for GameRant, wrote "Neverwinter is the first true MMO for Xbox One, and it delivers well on that premise." And stated that "Despite its PvP shortcomings and current framrate issues, Neverwinter proves to be a solid MMO for Xbox One owners. Although it's certainly not a hardcore MMORPG, it's a fantastic starting point for console gamers or those who have little experience in the genre. Those who venture through the game will discover an enjoyable and challenging adventure that keeps their attention, provides plenty of unique experiences, and keeps them coming back for more".

PlayStation 4 
In 2016, Ryan Winslett, for CinemaBlend, wrote "[S]ince Neverwinter has proven to be a solid action MMO, you really have nothing to lose by giving it a shot".

In 2016, Jason Bohn, for Hardcore Gamer, wrote "Taking on a review of a title the size and scope of Cryptic Studio’s Neverwinter is a daunting process, to put it mildly. The thing is just gigantic." and that "For no cost (not even a PlayStation Plus subscription is required), players can jump in and play one of the best MMORPGs available on the market at any price point today".

References

External links
 Official website
 Official wiki

2013 video games
Active massively multiplayer online games
Cryptic Studios games
Fantasy massively multiplayer online role-playing games
Forgotten Realms video games
Free-to-play video games
Instanced massively multiplayer online role-playing games
PlayStation 4 games
Role-playing video games
Video games developed in the United States
Windows games
Xbox One games